James Duncan Hamilton (30 April 1920 in Cork, County Cork, Ireland – 13 May 1994 in Sherborne, Dorset, England) was a British racing driver. He was famed for his colourful and extrovert personality, which often overshadowed his genuine talent. After fighting in, and surviving the Second World War, he took up motorsport. Although adept in single-seaters, sportscars was where he enjoyed most success, winning the 1953 24 Heures du Mans, two Coupe de Paris events, and the 12 heures internationals Reims race in 1956. He retired in 1958 and ran a garage in Bagshot, Surrey for many years. He died from lung cancer in 1994.

Early years

Born in County Cork, Hamilton was brought up in relative obscurity. Prior to his 20th birthday, Europe was already embroiled in the Second World War. As a result, he would spend the war years as part of the Fleet Air Arm flying Lysanders. After the war ended, he opened a car garage. During the years between the war ending and the start of the 1950s, Duncan started racing in local events. He cut his teeth in such pre-wars as the MG R-type and the Bugatti Type 35B. After racing a Maserati 6CM in 1948, Duncan graduated to a Talbot-Lago Grand Prix car.

Formula One career

He participated in five World Championship Grands Prix and 18 non-Championship Formula One races. His best results in the non-Championship events were fourth place in the 1948 Zandvoort Grand Prix with a Maserati 6CM, third in the 1951 Richmond Trophy (ERA B-Type), second in the 1951 BRDC International Trophy (Talbot-Lago T26C), third in the 1952 Richmond Trophy (Talbot-Lago T26C) and fourth in the 1952 Internationales ADAC Eifelrennen (HWM-Alta).

That fourth place at Zandvoort, showed that he was right at home in the upper level of Grand Prix racing, especially as this was his debut at this level. After that impressive debut, things soon turned sour for Hamilton, at his last race of 1948, the RAC International Grand Prix, the first official post-WW2 British Grand Prix, he retired with oil pressure problems.

Throughout the 1949 Grand Prix season, he only suffered one retirement, however he did not finish higher than ninth, which he managed twice, both times at Goodwood. The following season, he competed in fewer Grand Prix races, while he expanded his racing experience by racing sportscars. He won the Wakefield Trophy, a minor Formula Libre race, held at Curragh in the Republic of Ireland. Hamilton performed beautifully before the Irish crowd.

In the wet, Hamilton had few peers. In his Talbot-Lago, he eclipsed even Juan Manuel Fangio at the soaking BRDC International Trophy race at Silverstone in 1951, when he finished second to Reg Parnell, but a long way ahead of Fangio who went on to win the World Championship that season.

24 Hours of Le Mans

He was best known for his success in the 24 Hours of Le Mans endurance race, which he took part in nine times, most famously in partnership with Tony Rolt. The pair finished fourth at their first attempt in the 1950 race and sixth in 1951, both times in a special-bodied Nash-Healey coupe. Their Jaguar C-Type did not finish in 1952, but they returned with a C-Type to win in 1953. They were second with a Jaguar D-Type in 1954, losing to a much larger-engined V12 Ferrari – and by the narrowest margin in years. They came within two miles of victory, Hamilton driving a storming race in the closing stages to halve the lead of the Scuderia Ferrari of José Froilán González and Maurice Trintignant, as the track was awash following a cloudburst. When the track started to dry out, the Ferrari hung on for a narrow triumph. He failed to finish in 1955. For 1956 Hamilton partnered Alfonso de Portago in a Ferrari but again did not finish. In 1957 he reverted to a Jaguar D-Type: partnered by the American driver Masten Gregory he came sixth. His last Le Mans appearance was in 1958, when the D-Type he shared with Ivor Bueb failed to finish.

Hamilton also won the 1956 Rheims 12-hour race for Jaguar with a D-Type co-driven by Ivor Bueb. Despite the win, the factory dropped him from their 1956 Le Mans roster for speeding up and passing team-mate Paul Frère's car at Rheims when Lofty England had ordered the entire team to slow down, hence his switch to a Ferrari that year. In 1957 Jaguar did not enter Le Mans – cars and equipment had been destroyed by a fire at the factory – and Hamilton used his privately owned D-Type.

Called from the bar

Hamilton famously won the 1953 event in a Jaguar C-Type shared with Rolt. Initially, the pairing were disqualified for practising in a Jaguar that had the same racing number as another on the circuit at the same time, but they were reinstated. Hamilton's account has become a motor racing legend: when Jaguar team manager Lofty England persuaded the organisers to let them race, both drivers were already drunk in a local bar.  England said: "Of course I would never have let them race under the influence. I had enough trouble when they were sober!"

When the race was under way the team tried to sober Hamilton up by giving him coffee during the pit stops but he refused it, saying it made his arms twitch; instead he was given brandy. The alcohol must have helped when he struck a bird face first at 130 mph and broke his nose. Despite the bizarre circumstances, the duo went on to win the race and recorded the first 100 mph average speed at Le Mans, a record pace.

Both England and Rolt have denied that they were drunk.

Lucky escapes

On one occasion in 1947, he was transporting his MG R-type to the Brighton Speed Trials, when going down a hill near Guildford, he "saw the splendid honeycomb radiator of a Bugatti in the outside rear-view mirror", so he moved over and waved it past, but the car hung back. Further down the hill, the Bugatti accelerated and drew level with Hamilton, at which point he saw there was no one in it: "The awful truth dawned on me – it was my own car, gathering speed fast." Hamilton had forgotten he was towing the Bugatti, and the story ends with a lamppost snapped in two.

A week after the 1953 Le Mans win, Hamilton drove to Oporto to prepare for the Portuguese Grand Prix. Held on the Circuito da Boavista, he was leading into the first corner of the race when he crashed his Jaguar heavily into an electricity pylon. The Jaguar cartwheeled, throwing him out of the car and into a tree. He hung there for about a minute, before falling down on the side of the circuit. Barely conscious, he moved his legs just as a Ferrari raced by, nearly taking Hamilton's left boot with it. He was taken to hospital for an emergency operation, though the medical facilities did not extend to anaesthetic; as the surgeon leant over him, Duncan was mesmerised by the increasing length of cigarette ash, as it hovered above his open chest cavity. The accident cut off the power supply to Oporto for several hours.

Retirement

Hamilton sustained unpleasant injuries during the 1958 24 Hours of Le Mans, while contesting the lead in his Jaguar D-Type, and then he was shattered by the death of his friend Mike Hawthorn in early 1959. That tragedy finally prompted him to hang up his racing helmet and gloves in 1959, and concentrated on his garage business in Bagshot. His love and passion for the finest classic motor cars led Hamilton to establish his own company back in 1948. Since then, Duncan Hamilton & Co Limited has become internationally recognised for being one of the most respected and well-connected specialists in historic cars.
 
He co-wrote an autobiography called Touch Wood!. Duncan Hamilton died in Sherborne, Dorset. His son Adrian Hamilton, a classic car dealer, ran his father's garage in another location until his own death in 2021. Duncan's grandson Archie Hamilton is also a racing driver.

As Earl Howe wrote in the original autobiography foreword in 1960, though the drivers of his age were fiercely competitive, there were also "friends to meet, stories to tell and almost certainly a party to be enjoyed.". Duncan was certainly larger than life, he wasn't just one of the most successful drivers of the 1950s, but also the man who trespassed at Brooklands, who spent the war in the Fleet Air Arm accidentally trying to drown American Admirals and who was once stopped for speeding whilst rushing to take part in a TV programme on road safety.

Hamilton is regarded as the epitome of the old school English competitor. He, and many of his contemporaries such as Hawthorn, Rolt and Peter Collins, raced mainly for the love of the sport, branding them as gentlemen drivers.

Racing record

Career highlights

Complete World Championship results
(key)

Complete 24 Hours of Le Mans results

Complete 12 Hours of Sebring results

Complete 12 Hours of Reims results

Complete 12 Hours of Pescara results

Complete 12 Hours of Hyères results

References

Further reading

 Duncan Hamilton. Touch Wood - The Autobiography of the 1953 Le Man Winner John Blake Publishing. 2014 978-1782197737.
 Paul Skilleter. Jaguar Sports Cars. G T Foulis & Co Ltd. 1976 .

English racing drivers
English Formula One drivers
Talbot Formula One drivers
Hersham and Walton Motors Formula One drivers
1920 births
1994 deaths
Sportspeople from Cork (city)
People educated at Brighton College
Fleet Air Arm aviators
World Sportscar Championship drivers
24 Hours of Le Mans drivers
24 Hours of Le Mans winning drivers
24 Hours of Spa drivers
Mille Miglia drivers
12 Hours of Reims drivers
Fleet Air Arm personnel of World War II